"Stuck on You" is a song written by and originally recorded by American singer and songwriter Lionel Richie. It was the fourth single released from his second studio album, Can't Slow Down, released on May 1, 1984, by Motown, and achieved chart success, particularly in the US and the UK, where it peaked at number three and number 12, respectively. "Stuck on You" reached number one on the Adult Contemporary chart, Richie's seventh chart topper.

The song marks Lionel Richie's country music debut, and indeed, "Stuck on You" peaked at number 24 on the country chart.  As such, the single's cover photo shows Richie wearing a cowboy hat.

The song appears in a 2022 TV commercial for Pringles during NBC's coverage of Super Bowl LVI on February 13, 2022.

Background
The song differs from Richie's other compositions, as it displays a country pop influence rather than R&B.

Cash Box described the song as "an airtight and tender ballad with a nearly country twinge."

Track listings
 7" single
 "Stuck on You" – 3:10
 "Round and Round" – 4:48

 12" maxi
 "Stuck on You" – 3:10
 "Round and Round" – 4:48
 "Tell Me" – 5:28

Charts

Weekly charts

Year-end charts

Certifications

3T version

In 2003, "Stuck on You" was covered by American band 3T. It was the first single from the band's second studio album Identity, on which the song also appears in a remixed version called 'Smooth Mix' (also available on the CD maxi). Released in summer 2003, it achieved success in the Netherlands, Belgium and France, where it was a top ten hit.

Track listings
 CD maxi
 "Stuck on You" – 3:32
 "Stuck on You" (Smooth Mix) – 3:58
 "Disappeared" – 3:32

 CD single – promo
 "Stuck on You" (Radio Mix) – 3:32

Charts

Weekly charts

Year-end charts

Certifications

Other covers and sampling
Another cover was recorded by British reggae singer Trevor Walters in 1984 (only 3 months after the original). This version was Walters' biggest hit in his home country peaking inside the Top 10 of the UK Singles Chart. In fact, it was so successful that it peaked higher than Richie's original.
Other covers involve reggae singers Beres Hammond, Frankie Paul, and Eddie Lovette.
The song's chorus was used in the song "Stuck on Replay" by the German EDM group Scooter.
Charlie Masso of Menudo would cover Stuck On You and other Lionel Richie songs during Menudo's live concerts and their television series Menudo Mania.
The verses were used in a song with the same title by the Hawaiian music group Ekolu in 1999.

See also
List of Hot Adult Contemporary number ones of 1984

References

1984 singles
2003 singles
Lionel Richie songs
3T songs
Songs written by Lionel Richie
1983 songs
Motown singles
Warner Music Group singles
Country ballads
Pop ballads